Verdoy Schoolhouse, also known as District No. 7 Schoolhouse, is a historic one-room school building located at Newtonville in Albany County, New York.  It was built in 1910 and is an asymmetrical frame building. It features a slate covered hipped roof crowned by a small belfry and a massive chimney at the center of the roof. Until 1996 when moved to the grounds of the Casparus F. Pruyn House, the school was located on Troy-Schenectady Rd. and was previously listed in 1985 as the Verdoy School.

It was listed originally on the National Register of Historic Places in 1985 and relisted in 1997.

References

External links
Friends of the Pruyn House

History museums in New York (state)
School buildings on the National Register of Historic Places in New York (state)
School buildings completed in 1910
Schools in Albany County, New York
National Register of Historic Places in Albany County, New York